Pokośno  is a village in the administrative district of Gmina Suchowola, within Sokółka County, northeast Poland. The village has a population of 150.

Notable people
Teresa Komendant, mother of American actor Danny Pudi, moved to the U.S. from Pokośno

References

Villages in Sokółka County